Rudy Linka (born 29 May 1960) is a jazz guitarist from the Czech Republic.

From 1975–1979, he studied classical guitar as a teenager at the Prague Conservatory and learned jazz through his mentor, Karel Velebný. After travelling to Germany in 1980, he defected to the West in Sweden. In the first half of the 1980s, he studied composition and classical guitar at the Stockholm Music Institute. While in Sweden he began his collaboration with American double bassist Red Mitchell.

In 1985 he moved to Boston and attended the Berklee College of Music. The following year he moved to New York City, where he studied at the New School for Jazz and Contemporary Music with John Abercrombie, Dave Liebman, and Arnie Lawrence. He studied privately with guitarists Jim Hall and John Scofield and before leading his own group.

Linka has performed and recorded with Jon Batiste, Larry Grenadier, Gil Goldstein, Paul Motian, Bob Mintzer, John Scofield, John Abercrombie, Kenny Wollesen, and Marvin "Smitty" Smith on labels such as Timeless, Enja, Sony BMG, and Universal. In 1998 he was voted one of the ten best guitarists by the readers of Down Beat magazine

Linka is the founder and artistic director of the Bohemia Jazz Fest which takes place every July in the Czech Republic.

Discography 
 Rudy Linka Quartet (1991)
 News from Home, (1992)
 Mostly Standards, (1993)
 Live It Up, (1994)
 Czech It Out, (1995)
 Always Double Czech, (1997)
 Emotions In Motion, (1999)
 Just Between Us, (2000)
 Every Moment, (2001)
 Simple Pleasures, (2002)
 Trip, (2005)
 Lucky Southern, (2006)
 Jazz Collection
 Beyond the New York City Limits, (2006)
 Songs, (2008) (with Paul Motian and Larry Grenadier)
 Re:Connect (2013) (with Kenny Wollesen, Larry Grenadier, and Jon Batiste)
 Acoustic & Electric (2015)

References

External links 
 

Czech guitarists
Male guitarists
1960 births
Living people
Musicians from Prague
Czech jazz musicians
Czech exiles